Kert Kingo (born 5 March 1968 in Tartu) is an Estonian politician. She served as Minister of Foreign Trade and Information Technology in the second cabinet of Jüri Ratas from 16 May 2019 to 25 October 2019. She resigned after lying over the appointment of an advisor. Kaimar Karu was appointed as her successor. She is affiliated with the Conservative People's Party of Estonia.

References 

1968 births
21st-century Estonian politicians
21st-century Estonian women politicians
Conservative People's Party of Estonia politicians
Government ministers of Estonia
Living people
Members of the Riigikogu, 2019–2023
Members of the Riigikogu, 2023–2027
Politicians from Tartu
Women government ministers of Estonia